This page displays the formation signs of higher formations (above division) of the British Army during the First and Second World Wars, and after. For completeness it also shows those signs of Commonwealth and Empire formations which fought alongside the British, and multi national formations they were a part of. In addition to the  field forces, lines of communication and home rear echelon formation signs are also shown.

First World War
Armies and Corps used the pre-existing scheme of red and black or red and white for army and corps respectively, with a number applied as an identifier. When this insecure method of identification was banned by order in 1916, other signs were used, but the army and corps colours continued to be used in some cases. These designs were used as vehicle signs and on notices, and not sewn directly on to the uniform. Army and Corps command personnel wore armbands when required (red-black-red for army or red-white-red for corps) to which was added the relevant sign.

Army

Corps

Commonwealth and Empire

Second World War

By the start of the Second World War, the British Army prohibited all identifying marks on its Battle Dress uniforms save for drab (black or white on khaki) regimental or corps (branch) slip-on titles, and even these were not to be worn in the field. In May 1940 an order (Army Council Instruction (ACI) 419) was issued banning division signs worn on uniforms, even though some were in use on vehicles in France.

In September 1940 the order was replaced with ACI 1118, and formation signs were permitted to be worn on uniform below the shoulder title by those troops in independent brigades, divisions, (field) corps and command headquarters. Below this, troops of the British Army wore an 'arm of service' stripe ( by ) showing the relevant corps colour (for the higher formations, these were most often the supporting arms, for example Engineers, red and blue, Service Corps, blue and yellow, RAMC dark cherry, and so on, see right).

Until D-Day these signs were only to be displayed or worn in Britain, if a formation went overseas all formation markings had to be removed from vehicles (tactical signs excepted) and uniforms. This order was obeyed to varying degrees in various theatres of war. However all 21st Army Group formations wore their signs when they went to France.

In the British Army, ACI 1118 specified that the design for the formation sign should be approved by the general officer commanding the formation and reported to the War Office. A further order of December 1941 (ACI 2587) specified the material of the uniform patch as printed cotton (ordnance issue), this replaced the embroidered felt (or fulled wool) or metal badges used previously. In other theatres the uniform patch could be made from a variety of materials including printed or woven cotton, woven silk, leather or metal embroidered felt (or fulled wool).

General Head Quarters and Theatre

Army group
.

Army

Commonwealth and Empire

Commands

U.K., Commonwealth and Empire
Commands were notionally of Army level, some choosing army command colours (red and black) and in the U.K. in the early years of the war could command one or more corps as 'Corps districts'. In Southern Command (United Kingdom) the colouring of the shield and sometimes the stars was varied according to the wearers arm of service, 18 second world war varieties are known including the headquarters, and the Auxiliary Territorial Service.

Shown below are the commands on the territory of the United Kingdom, Commonwealth or Empire nations.

Corps
The corps formation sign would be worn by headquarters and any attached troops, that is, those not in a division, independent infantry or armoured brigade, an Army Group Royal Artillery or a lines of communication formation. After the B.E.F.'s return from France, existing and newly formed Corps (I - XII) were allocated districts, and known as 'Corps districts', under the existing Home Commands, as shown below. They were replaced by military districts during 1942 and 1943. Not shown are VI Corps, based in Northern Ireland and VII Corps based around Oxfordshire and Gloucestershire, neither had a formation sign as a real formation and both were disbanded before the end of 1940.

The appropriate arm of service strip would be worn below the sign on a uniform (see above), with the exception of some (service) corps in I Corps, which altered the colours of the diamond as appropriate. For example, engineers (two diagonal blue stripes on the diamond), signals (a blue diamond), artillery (diamond halved vertically, blue and red) and service corps (diamond halved horizontally blue on yellow).

Commonwealth and Empire
The Canadian and Australian uniform signs shown below are the headquarters signs. Canadian attached troops indicated their (service) corps with the addition of letters (for example R C E for the Royal Canadian Engineers or a maroon stripe for the Royal Canadian Medical Service). Australian attached troops indicated their (service) corps by replacing the black and white triangles with their corps colour (I Corps), or central triangle (II and III Corps) and replacing the black triangle with the green or red of the field corps, for example purple for the Royal Australian Engineers or brown for the Australian Army Medical Corps.

Districts
Military districts, the level below area commands were constantly changing, the signs below do not show a 'snap-shot' in time for any command area. Being local formations, the signs reference local attributes such as history, geography, industry, regimental affiliations and heraldry.

Britain

India

Mediterranean and Middle East

Lines of Communications
Depending on the theatre of operations these units could be under command of the Theatre, Army Group or Army.  The Australian signs show the headquarters design for that formation, attached troops wore an additional colour/shape combination (for example, Service Corps sections wore a white on blue design in the centre of the patch).

Post War

Armies and Commands

Corps and Districts

References

Bibliography

 Cigarette card series, Army, Corps and Divisional Signs 1914–1918, John Player and sons, 1920s.

Military insignia
Military insignia
British Army unit insignia
Insignia
Field armies of the United Kingdom in World War I
Field armies of the United Kingdom in World War II
Military units and formations of the British Empire in World War II
Army units and formations of Canada in World War II
Military heraldry
British military uniforms